"Deeper Love" is a song performed by David Longoria and CeCe Peniston, released on Del Oro Music in 2005.

The single release included eleven remixes in total (among others also from Junior Vasquez, Ryan Humphries, L.E.X., and Richard Earnshaw).

The song peaked at number fourteen in the Billboard Hot Dance Music/Club Play on November 19, and remained in the chart for eleven weeks in total.

Credits and personnel
 David Longoria – writer, lead vocal, remix, producer
 CeCe Peniston – lead vocal
 Junior Vasquez – remix
 Robert Eibach – co-producer, engineer. remixer
 Mauro Lucero – co-producer, engineer
 Eddie X – remix
 Luigi Gonzales – remix
 Richard Earnshaw – remix
 The Original Tippa Lee – featuring
 Andrew Wright – featuring
 Ryan Humphries – remix, design
 Adam Reinhart – remix co-producer
 Eddie Rouse – photography
 Del Oro Music (BMI) – publisher

Track listing and format
 CDM, US, #DEL ORO 25078
 "Deeper Love" (Junior Vasquez Club Mix) – 8:48
 "Deeper Love" (L.E.X. Mambo Vocal Mix) – 8:50
 "Deeper Love" (Groove Finders Mix) – 6:37
 "Deeper Love" (Rasta Men Mix) – 6:14
 "Deeper Love" (Ryan Humphries Club Mix) – 6:59
 "Deeper Love" (d-Ion Espana Mix) – 6:09
 "Deeper Love" (Ryan Humphries Chill Mix) – 5:01
 "Deeper Love" (INTRAvenis Mix) – 6:03
 "Deeper Love" (Ryan Humphries Industrial Mix) – 6:00
 "Deeper Love" (Break-a-Leg Down Mix) – 6:52
 "Deeper Love" (L.E.X. Mambo Dub Mix) – 9:03

Charts

Weekly charts

See also
 House Music
 House dance
 List of house artists
 Electronic dance music
 List of artists who reached number one on the US Dance chart

References

General

 Specific

External links 
 
 

2005 singles
CeCe Peniston songs
2005 songs